Mirina is genus of moths in the Endromidae family. It was previously assigned to the family Bombycidae or its own family, the Mirinidae. The genus contains three described species.

Species 

 Mirina christophi
 Mirina confucius
 Mirina fenzeli

References

 Zolotuhin, V.V.; Witt, T.J. 2000: The Mirinidae of Vietnam (Lepidoptera). Entomofauna (ISSN 0250-4413), supplement 11(2): 13-24. Full article (PDF)

External links
Catalog of Life
Natural History Museum Lepidoptera genus database
Increased gene sampling yields robust support for higher-level clades within Bombycoidea (Lepidoptera)

Endromidae